Eric Donaldson (born 11 June 1947 in Bog Walk, Jamaica) is a Jamaican reggae singer-songwriter. He originated in Saint Catherine, Jamaica.

Biography
Born in Kent Village, about 2 miles from Bog Walk, Donaldson first recorded for Studio One in 1964, although producer Clement Dodd declined to release the material. In the mid-1960s he formed The West Indians with Leslie Burke and Hector Brooks, and they had a hit with the J.J. Johnson-produced "Right On Time" in 1968, going on to record with Lee "Scratch" Perry and subsequently changing their name to the Kilowatts, but without further success.

Donaldson then pursued a solo career, and submitted "Cherry Oh Baby" to the 1971 Jamaican Festival Song Competition, going on to win the competition and giving him a big Jamaican hit single. Donaldson has won the competition six times, in 1971, 1977, 1978, 1984, 1993 and 1997. "Cherry Oh Baby" has been covered by both The Rolling Stones (on their 1976 album, Black and Blue) and UB40 (on their 1983 album, Labour of Love). The riddim has remained extremely popular – over thirty cover versions have been recorded, including an update by Donaldson himself. Two of his festival winners ("Sweet Jamaica" (1977) and "Land of My Birth" (1978)) were written by Winston Wallace. In an online poll held in 2013 by the Jamaica Cultural Development Commission, "Land of My Birth" was voted the most popular winner in the contest's history.

Donaldson currently lives in Kent Village, Jamaica.

Discography

Albums
Eric Donaldson (1971), Jaguar – reissued with bonus tracks as Love of the Common People
Keep on Riding (1976), Dynamic Sounds
Kent Village (1978), Dynamic Sounds
Juan De Bolas (1980), Dynamic Sounds – also released as Stand Up
Rock Me Gentle (1981), Serengeti
Come Away (1982), Dynamic Sounds
Right On Time (1985), Dynamic Sounds
Rocky Road (1986), Capitol Records and EMI Nigeria. 
The System (1985), WEA – reissued as Children of Jah
Crazy You Crazy Me (1988)
Trouble in Afrika (1991)
Blackman Victory (1993) – reissued with bonus tracks as Beautiful Day
Peace and Love (1998), Joe Gibbs – reissued as Young and Reckless
In Action (2000), Roots & Culture – with Sil Bell & Keith Coley
Mr. Pirate (2004), Ice – reissued as 100% of Love

Compilation albums
Cherry Oh Baby (1997), Trojan
The Very Best of Eric Donaldson (1992), Rhino
Very Best of Eric Donaldson (1998), Musicrama
Oh What a Feeling (1998), Rhino
Beautiful Day (1999)
Freedom Street (1999), Rhino
Super Medley Hits (2000), T.P.
Greetings (2001), Rhino
The Very Best of Eric Donaldson Vol.1 (2002), Rhino
Anthology (2003), Creole
Cherry Oh Baby (2003), Smith & Co
Eric Donaldson Sings 20 Jamaica Classics (2004)
Cherry Oh Baby (The Best Of) (2006), Trojan

References

External links
 interview with Eric Donaldson
 

Jamaican reggae musicians
1947 births
Living people
People from Saint Catherine Parish
Rochester Institute of Technology alumni
Trojan Records artists